Harendra Singh Malik is an ex-Member of the Parliament of India representing Haryana in the Rajya Sabha, the upper house of the Indian Parliament. He hails from Muzzafarnagar. He is a well known Jat leader in Western UP.

He was first elected as an MLA in 1985 from Khatauli seat on a Lok Dal ticket and then in 1989 moved to Baghra seat after joining Janata Dal and remained an MLA for next seven years for the same place. Mr. Harendra Malik has been an active farmers' leader and represented their interests at various levels.

His son Pankaj Kumar Malik was elected as MLA for two straight terms from 2007 to 2017 representing Baghra and Shamli Assembly seat in 15th and 16th legislative assembly of Uttar Pradesh respectively.

Elections contested

Positions held

References

Rajya Sabha members from Haryana
Living people
Indian National Lok Dal politicians
Members of the Haryana Legislative Assembly
Indian National Congress politicians
Year of birth missing (living people)
Lok Dal politicians
Janata Dal politicians